Takada Station (高田駅) is the name of multiple train stations in Japan:

 Takada Station (Nara)
 Takada Station (Niigata)

See also 
 高田駅 (disambiguation)
 Kōda Station (disambiguation)
 Takata Station (disambiguation)